Hardana  is a Syrian village located in Barri Sharqi Subdistrict in Salamiyah District, Hama. According to the Syria Central Bureau of Statistics (CBS), Hardana had a population of 142 in the 2004 census.

References 

Populated places in Salamiyah District